Steklno  (German Stecklin) is a village in the administrative district of Gmina Gryfino, within Gryfino County, West Pomeranian Voivodeship, in north-western Poland, close to the German border.

In 2011, the village had a population of 250.

Steklno has their own football team called "Wicher Steklno".

See also
 History of Pomerania

References

Villages in Gryfino County